Corey Donte Ray (born September 22, 1994) is an American professional baseball outfielder who is a free agent. He previously played in Major League Baseball (MLB) for the Milwaukee Brewers.

Career

Amateur
Ray attended Simeon Career Academy in Chicago, Illinois. In the summer prior to his senior year, he played in the 2012 Under Armour All-American Game. He was drafted by the Seattle Mariners in the 33rd round of the 2013 Major League Baseball Draft but did not sign and attended the University of Louisville to play college baseball for the Louisville Cardinals.

Ray appeared in 43 games and made 19 starts as a freshman at Louisville in 2014. He hit .325/.416/.481 with one home run and 17 runs batted in (RBI). After the 2014 season, he played collegiate summer baseball with the Wareham Gatemen of the Cape Cod Baseball League. As a sophomore in 2015, he started all 65 games and hit .325/.389/.543 with 11 home runs, 56 RBI and 34 stolen bases. Against Wake Forest, Ray stole home in the bottom of the ninth inning, to give Louisville the win. After the season, he played for the United States collegiate national team during the summer.

Professional
In the 2016 Major League Baseball draft, the Milwaukee Brewers selected Ray with the fifth overall selection. He signed and spent his first professional season with both the Brevard County Manatees  of the Class A-Advanced Florida State League and the Wisconsin Timber Rattlers of the Class A Midwest League, batting .239 with five home runs, 17 RBI, and ten stolen bases in 60 games between both teams. Ray spent 2017 with the Carolina Mudcats of the Class A-Advanced Carolina League, where he posted a .238 batting average with seven home runs, 48 RBI, and 24 stolen bases in 112 games. He played the 2018 season with the Biloxi Shuckers of the Class AA Southern League. After batting .239 with 27 home runs, 74 RBI and 37 stolen bases, he was awarded the Southern League Most Valuable Player Award. Ray began 2019 with the San Antonio Missions of the Class AAA Pacific Coast League, but missed time during the season due to injury. Over 53 games with San Antonio, he batted .188 with seven home runs and 21 RBIs.

Ray was added to the Brewers 40-man roster following the 2019 season. He did not play a minor league game in 2020 due to the cancellation of the minor league season caused by the COVID-19 pandemic.

On April 24, 2021, Ray was promoted to the major leagues for the first time. He made his MLB debut that day as a pinch hitter for Freddy Peralta, recording a walk, scoring a run, and moving to right field later in the game. He was outrighted to Triple-A on June 17, 2022.  He became a free agent after the season.

References

External links

Louisville Cardinals bio

1994 births
Living people
African-American baseball players
Baseball players from Chicago
Major League Baseball outfielders
Milwaukee Brewers players
Louisville Cardinals baseball players
Wareham Gatemen players
Arizona League Brewers players
Brevard County Manatees players
Wisconsin Timber Rattlers players
Carolina Mudcats players
Salt River Rafters players
Biloxi Shuckers players
San Antonio Missions players
Nashville Sounds players
21st-century African-American sportspeople